The list of naval ship classes of Germany includes all classes of naval ships produced or operated in Germany from the late 19th century to modern day.

See also:
 List of naval ships of Germany for a list of individual ships
 List of German Navy ship classes for modern German type classifications

Aircraft carriers

Displacement:  23,200 tons
 Armament:  16 x 15 cm guns, 10 x 10.5 cm guns, 22 x 3.7 cm AA guns, 28 x 2 cm AA guns
 Aircraft:  Up to 37, including Bf 109T, Ju 87C, and Fi 167
 Performance:  Speed ; Range  at 
 Ships in class:  2:   and Flugzeugträger B
 Service:  Neither vessel was commissioned into service

Surface combatants

Battleships (Schlachtschiffe) 
See list of battleships of Germany for detailed listings

Battlecruisers (Schlachtkreuzer)

Monitors (Küstenpanzerschiffe)

Displacement:  5,652 tons
 Armament:  8 x 24 cm guns
 Armor: 
 Performance:  Speed 
 Ships in class:  1:  
 Service:  Launched 1884

Displacement:  3,740 tons
 Armament:  3 x 24 cm guns; 10 x 8.8 cm guns; 4 x 45 cm torpedo tubes
 Armor:  530 mm belt; 200 mm turret; 50 mm deck
 Performance:  Speed ; Range  at 
 Service:  Commissioned 1890 to 1896

Displacement:  3,740 tons - 4,250 tons
 Armament:  3 x 24 cm guns; 8-10 x 8.8 cm guns; 3-4 x 45 cm torpedo tubes
 Armor:  530 mm belt; 200 mm turret; 50 mm deck
 Performance:  Speed ; Range  at 
 Ships in class:  2:  , and 
 Service:  Commissioned 1890 to 1896

Heavy cruisers (Schwere Kreuzer)

Displacement:  18,200 tons (18,400 tons for Prinz Eugen)
 Armament:  8 x 20 cm (8") guns; 12 x 10.5 cm guns; 6 x 4 cm AA guns; 8 x 3.7 cm AA guns; 32 x 2 cm AA guns; 12 x 53 cm (21") torpedo tubes (Prinz Eugen shipped 17 x 4 cm guns, 28 x 2 cm guns, and no 3.7 cm guns)
 Armor:  80 mm belt; 105 mm turret; 50 mm deck
 Service:  Three ships completed, commissioned 1939 to 1940, two lost in World War II

Displacement:  14,500 tons
 Armament:  6 x 28 cm (11") guns; 8 x 15 cm guns; 6 x 8.8 cm guns; 8 x 3.7 cm AA guns; 8 x 2 cm AA guns; 8 x 53 cm (21") torpedo tubes
 Armor:  80 mm belt; 140 mm turret; 40 mm deck
 Performance:  Speed ; Range  at 
 Ships in class:  3:   (renamed ), and 
 Service:  Commissioned 1933 to 1936, both lost during World War II

Armored cruisers (Panzerkreuzer)

Displacement:  17,500 tons
 Armament:  12 x 21 cm guns; 8 x 15 cm guns; 16 x 8.8 cm guns; 4 x 45 cm torpedo tubes
 Armor:  180 mm belt; 180 mm turret; 70 mm deck
 Performance:  Speed ; Range  at 
 Ships in class:  1
 Service:  Commissioned 1909, sunk 1915

Displacement:  12,985 tons
 Armament:  8 x 21 cm guns; 6 x 15 cm guns; 18 x 8.8 cm guns; 4 x 3.7 cm guns; 4 x machineguns; 4 x 45 cm torpedo tubes
 Armor:  150 mm belt; 170 mm turret; 70 mm deck
 Performance:  Speed ; Range  at 
 Ships in class:  2:   and 
 Service:  Commissioned 1907 to 1908, both lost in World War I at the Battle of the Falkland Islands

Displacement:  10,266 tons
 Armament:  4 x 21 cm guns; 10 x 15 cm guns; 14 x 8.8 cm guns; 4 x 3.7 cm guns; 4 x 45 cm torpedo tubes
 Armor:  100 mm belt; 150 mm turret; 60 mm deck
 Performance:  Speed ; Range  at 
 Ships in class:  2:   and 
 Service:  Commissioned 1905 to 1906, Yorck lost in World War I

Displacement:  9,800 tons
 Armament:  4 x 21 cm guns; 10 x 15 cm guns; 12 x 8.8 cm guns; 4 x 3.7 cm guns; 4 x 45 cm torpedo tubes
 Armor:  100 mm belt; 150 mm turret; 60 mm deck
 Performance:  Speed ; Range  at 
 Ships in class:  2:   and 
 Service:  Commissioned 1903 to 1904, both lost in World War I

Displacement:  9,800 tons
 Armament:  2 x 24 cm guns; 10 x 15 cm guns; 10 x 8.8 cm guns; 10 x 3.7 cm guns; 4 x 45 cm torpedo tubes
 Armor:  100 mm turret; 50 mm deck
 Performance:  Speed ; Range  at 
 Ships in class:  1
 Service:  Commissioned 1902

Displacement:  11,460 tons
 Armament:  4 x 24 cm guns; 12 x 15 cm guns; 10 x 8.8 cm guns; 4 x machineguns; 6 x 45 cm torpedo tubes
 Armor:  200 mm belt; 200 mm turret; 50 mm deck
 Performance:  Speed ; Range  at 
 Ships in class:  1
 Service:  Commissioned 1900

Protected cruisers (Geschützte Kreuzer)

Displacement:  6,790 tons
 Armament:  2 x 21 cm (8") guns; 6 x 15 cm guns; 10 x 8.8 cm guns; 4 x machineguns; 5 x 45 cm torpedo tubes
 Armor:  100 mm turret; 100 mm deck
 Performance:  Speed ; Range  at 
 Service:  Commissioned 1899

Displacement:  6,300 tons
 Armament:  4 x 15 cm guns; 6 x 10 cm guns; 5 x 35 cm torpedo tubes (1896 modification added 8 x 15 cm guns and 8 x 8.8 cm guns, removed all 10 cm guns; 1916 modification added 4 x 10 cm guns and 1 x 8.8 cm gun, removed 11 x 15 cm guns and all torpedo tubes)
 Armor:  70 mm deck
 Performance:  Speed ; Range  at 
 Ships in class:  1
 Service:  Commissioned 1895

Light cruisers (Leichte Kreuzer)

Displacement:  8,400 tons (9,000 tons for Nürnberg)
 Armament:  9 x 15 cm (6") guns; 6 x 8.8 cm guns; 8 x 3.7 cm guns; 4 x 2 cm guns; 12 x 53 cm (21") torpedo tubes; 120 mines (Nürnberg shipped an additional 2 x 8.8 cm guns and 2 x 4 cm AA guns)
 Aircraft:  2 catapult launched Arado Ar 196
 Armor:  50 mm belt; 30 mm turret; 20 mm deck
 Performance:  Speed ; Range  at 
 Ships in class:  2:   and 
 Service:  Commissioned 1931 and 1935, Leipzig damaged in 1944 in collision and reduced to flak ship, both survived World War II

Displacement:  7,700 tons
 Armament:  9 x 15 cm (6") guns; 2 x 8.8 cm guns; 12 x 50 cm torpedo tubes; 120 mines (1934 modification added 8 x 3.7 cm AA guns and replaced torpedoes with 53 cm tubes; 1940 modification added 4 x 8.8 cm guns; 1945 modification added 10 x 2 cm AA guns)
 Armor:  70 mm belt; 20 mm turret; 40 mm deck
 Performance:  Speed ; Range  at 
 Service:  Commissioned 1929 to 1930, all lost in World War II

Displacement:  7,485 tons
 Armament:  8 x 15 cm guns; 3 x 8.8 cm guns; 4 x 60 cm torpedo tubes; 200 mines
 Performance:  Speed ; Range  at 
 Service:  Seven launched, two commissioned 1918, both scuttled at Scapa Flow

Displacement:  7,125 tons
 Armament:  8 x 15 cm guns; 2 x 8.8 cm guns; 4 x 50 cm torpedo tubes; 200 mines
 Armor:  60 mm belt; 40 mm deck
 Performance:  Speed ; Range  at 
 Service:  Commissioned 1916 to 1917, two scuttled at Scapa Flow

Displacement:  7,100 tons
 Armament:  8 x 15 cm (6") guns; 3 x 8.8 cm guns; 6 x 2 cm AA guns; 4 x 50 cm torpedo tubes; 120 mines (1944 modification replaced 8.8 cm guns with 10.5 cm guns, added 2 x 3.7 cm AA guns and 14 x 2 cm AA guns, and replaced torpedoes with 53 cm (21") tubes)
 Armor:  50 mm belt; 40 mm deck
 Performance:  Speed ; Range  at 
 Ships in class:  1
 Service:  Commissioned 1925, damaged by bombing April 1945, scuttled May 1945

Displacement:  6,380 tons
 Armament:  12 x 10.5 cm guns; 2 x 50 cm torpedo tubes; 120 mines (1915 modification replaced 10.5 cm guns with 7 x 15 cm guns and added 2 x 8.8 cm guns and 2 x 50 cm tubes)
 Armor:  60 mm belt; 40 mm deck
 Performance:  Speed ; Range  at 
 Ships in class:  2:   and 
 Service:  Commissioned 1914 to 1915, one lost in World War II

Displacement:  6,190 tons
 Armament:  12 x 10.5 cm guns; 2 x 45 cm torpedo tubes
 Armor:  60 mm belt; 60 mm deck
 Performance:  Speed ; Range  at 
 Ships in class:  2:   and 
 Service:  Commissioned 1914, both lost in World War I

Displacement:  5,850 tons
 Armament:  4 x 15 cm guns; 2 x 8.8 cm guns; 2 x 50 cm torpedo tubes; 400 mines
 Armor:  38 mm belt; 16 mm deck
 Performance:  Speed ; Range  at 
 Ships in class:  2:   and 
 Service:  Commissioned 1916, both scuttled at Scapa Flow

Displacement:  5,250 tons
 Armament:  8 x 15 cm guns; 4 x 5.2 cm guns; 2 x 50 cm torpedo tubes; 120 mines
 Armor:  80 mm deck
 Performance:  Speed ; Range  at 
 Ships in class:  2:   and 
 Service:  Commissioned 1914 to 1915, one lost in World War I, one lost in World War II

Displacement:  5,200 tons
 Armament:  8 x 15 cm guns; 4 x 5.2 cm guns; 4 x 50 cm torpedo tubes; 120 mines
 Armor:  60 mm belt; 40 mm deck
 Performance:  Speed ; Range  at 
 Ships in class:  2:   and 
 Service:  Commissioned 1915, one lost in World War I

Displacement:  4,900 tons
 Armament:  12 x 10.5 cm guns; 4 x 5.2 cm guns; 2 x 45 cm torpedo tubes; 100 mines (1917 modification replaced 10.5 cm guns with 6 x 15 cm guns and 2 x 8.8 cm guns)
 Armor:  50 mm deck
 Performance:  Speed ; Range  at 
 Service:  Commissioned 1909 to 1911, two lost in World War I

Displacement:  4,570 tons
 Armament:  12 x 10.5 cm guns; 2 x 50 cm torpedo tubes; 120 mines
 Armor:  60 mm belt; 40 mm deck
 Performance:  Speed ; Range  at 
 Service:  Commissioned 1912, two lost in World War I

Displacement:  4,275 tons
 Armament:  10 x 10.5 cm guns; 6 x 5 cm guns; 2 x 45 cm torpedo tubes
 Performance:  Speed ; Range  at 
 Ships in class:  1
 Service:  Commissioned 1894

Displacement:  4,250 tons
 Armament:  10 x 10.5 cm guns; 10 x machineguns; 2 x 45 cm torpedo tubes
 Armor:  100 mm belt; 25 mm deck
 Performance:  Speed ; Range  at 
 Ships in class:  2:  , and 
 Service:  Commissioned 1908 to 1909, both lost in World War I

Displacement:  3,800 tons
 Armament:  10 x 10.5 cm guns; 8 x 5.2 cm guns; 2 x 45 cm torpedo tubes
 Armor:  50 mm deck
 Performance:  Speed ; Range  at 
 Service:  Commissioned 1904 to 1907, two lost in World War I

Displacement:  3,700 tons
 Armament:  10 x 10.5 cm guns; 2 x 45 cm torpedo tubes (1916 modification added 2 x 15 cm guns and removed 4 x 10.5 cm guns)
 Armor:  50 mm deck
 Performance:  Speed ; Range  at 
 Service:  Commissioned 1904 to 1907, two lost in World War I, one lost in World War II

Displacement:  2,900 tons
 Armament:  10 x 10.5 cm guns; 14 x machineguns; 3 x 45 cm torpedo tubes; 120 mines
 Armor:  25 mm deck
 Performance:  Speed ; Range  at 
 Service:  Commissioned 1900 to 1904, three lost in World War I, two lost in World War II

Displacement:  2,266 tons
 Armament:  2 x 10.5 cm guns; 8 x 8.8 cm guns; 10 x 3.7 cm revolving cannon
 Performance:  Speed ; Range  at 
 Ships in class:  1
 Service:  Commissioned 1887

Displacement:  2,080 tons
 Armament:  4 x 8.8 cm guns; 6 x 5 cm guns; 3 x 45 cm torpedo tubes
 Performance:  Speed ; Range  at 
 Ships in class:  1
 Service:  Commissioned 1896, sunk 1914

Displacement:  1,860 tons
 Armament:  8 x 10.5 cm guns; 5 x revolver cannon; 2 x 35 cm torpedo tubes
 Performance:  Speed ; Range  at 
 Service:  Commissioned 1892 to 1893, one lost in World War I

Destroyers (Zerstörer)

(Type 103) 

 Displacement:  4,720 tons
 Armament:  2 x 127 mm guns; 2 x 20 mm autocannon; 1 x Mark 13 launcher with 40 missiles; 2 x Mark 49 launchers with 42 missiles; 6 x 324 mm torpedo tubes; 1 x ASROC launcher with 8 rockets
 Performance:  Speed 
 Service:  Commissioned from 1969, last decommissioned 2003

(Type 101) 
 Displacement:  4,360 tons
 Armament:  3 x 100 mm DP guns; 4 x twin 40 mm AA guns; 2 x twin MM38 Exocet launchers; 4 x 533 mm torpedo tubes; 2 x quad 375 mm anti submarine rocket launchers; 10 x depth charges; 90 x mines
 Performance:  Speed ; Range  at 
 Service:  Commissioned from 1964, last decommissioned 1994, all scrapped

Type 1936C 
 Displacement:  3,680 tons
 Armament:  6 x 12.8 cm DP guns; 6 x 3.7 cm AA guns; 14 x 2 cm AA guns; 6 x 53 cm torpedo tubes; 60 mines; 4 x depth charge launchers
 Performance:  Speed ; Range  at 
 Ships in class:  2
 Service:  Neither completed

Type 1936A 
 Displacement:  3,600 tons
 Armament:  4 x 12.7 cm guns; 4 x 3.7 cm AA guns; 5 x 2 cm AA guns; 8 x 53 cm torpedo tubes; 60 mines; 4 x depth charge launchers
 Performance:  Speed ; Range  at 
 Ships in class:  8 ( to )
 Service:  Commissioned 1940 to 1941, 4 lost in World War II, last scrapped 1958

Type 1936A (Mob) 
 Displacement:  3,590 tons
 Armament:  4 x 12.7 cm guns; 4 x 3.7 cm AA guns; 12 x 2 cm AA guns; 8 x 53 cm torpedo tubes; 60 mines; 4 x depth charge launchers
 Performance:  Speed ; Range  at 
 Service:  Commissioned 1942 to 1943, 2 lost in World War II, last scrapped 1964

Type 1936B 
 Displacement:  3,540 tons
 Armament:  5 x 12.7 cm guns; 4 x 3.7 cm AA guns; 16 x 2 cm AA guns; 8 x 53 cm torpedo tubes; 76 mines; 4 x depth charge launchers
 Performance:  Speed ; Range  at 
 Service:  Three ships commissioned 1943 to 1944, all lost in World War II

Type 1936 
 Displacement:  3,400 tons
 Armament:  5 x 12.7 cm guns; 4 x 3.7 cm AA guns; 4 x 2 cm AA guns; 8 x 53 cm torpedo tubes; 60 mines; 4 x depth charge launchers
 Performance:  Speed ; Range  at 
 Ships in class:  6 ( to )
 Service:  Commissioned 1938 to 1939, 5 lost in World War II, survivor scrapped 1956

Type 1934 
 Displacement:  3,150 tons
 Armament:  5 x 12.7 cm guns; 4 x 3.7 cm AA guns; 6 x 2 cm AA guns; 8 x 53 cm torpedo tubes; 60 mines
 Performance:  Speed ; Range  at 
 Ships in class:  4 ( to )
 Service:  Commissioned 1937, three sunk 1940, survivor scrapped 1947

Type 1934A 
 Displacement:  3,110 tons
 Armament:  5 x 12.7 cm guns; 4 x 3.7 cm AA guns; 6 x 2 cm AA guns; 8 x 53 cm torpedo tubes; 60 mines
 Performance:  Speed ; Range  at 
 Ships in class:  12 ( to )
 Service:  Commissioned 1937 to 1939, 7 lost in World War II, last scrapped 1958

Type 1942 
 Displacement:  2,720 tons
 Armament:  4 x 12.7 cm guns; 8 x 3.7 cm AA guns; 12 x 2 cm AA guns; 6 x 53 cm torpedo tubes; 50 mines
 Performance:  Speed ; Range  at 
 Ships in class:  1
 Service:  Launched but never commissioned

Flottentorpedoboot 
 Displacement:  2,587 tons
 Armament:  4 x 12.7 cm gun; 4 x 3.7 cm AA guns; 16 x 2 cm AA guns; 8 x 53 cm torpedo tubes; 50 mines; 4 x depth charge launchers
 Performance:  Speed ; Range  at 
 Ships in class:  3
 Service:  None commissioned

Type 1916 
 Displacement:  2,415 tons
 Armament:  4 x 15 cm gun; 4 x machineguns; 4 x 60 cm torpedo tube; 40 x mines
 Performance:  Speed ; Range  at 
 Service:  11 launched, 2 commissioned 1918 to 1919, all scrapped by 1939

(Type 119) 

 Displacement:  2,050 tons
 Armament:  5 x 5" guns; 10 x 40 mm AA guns; 10 x 20 mm AA guns; 2 x quintuple 21" torpedo tubes; 6 x depth charge launchers; 2 x depth charge racks
 Performance:  Speed 
 Ships in class:  6
 Service: Ex-USN World War II destroyers, commissioned from 1959, last decommissioned 1981

Torpedobootzertörer 
 Displacement:  1,843 tons
 Armament:  4 x 10.5 cm guns; 4 x 8.8 cm guns; 6 x 45 cm torpedo tubes; 12 mines
 Performance:  Speed ; Range  at 
 Service:  Commissioned 1915, one lost in World War I, five scuttled at Scapa Flow

Submarines (Unterseeboot)

Fleet and attack submarines

Type 212 
 Displacement:  1,830 tons submerged
 Armament:  6 x 533 mm torpedo tubes with 12 x torpedoes; 24 x mines external; IDAS missiles
 Performance:  Speed  submerged; Range  at  submerged,  at  surfaced; Depth 700 m
 Ships in class:  4 (U-31 to U-34), 2 ordered, 6 more planned
 Commissioned:  4 commissioned

Type XXI 
 Displacement:  1,819 tons submerged
 Armament:  6 x 533 mm torpedo tubes with 23 x torpedoes or 12 x mines
 Performance:  Speed  submerged; Range  at  submerged,  at  surfaced
 Ships in class:  118 (U-2501 to U-2531, U-2533 to U-2536, U-2538 to U-2546, U-2548, U-2551, U-2552, U-3001 to U-3035, U-3037 to U-3041, U-3044, and U-3501 to U-3530)
 Commissioned:  1944
 Fate: Few were ever launched, and all were captured by Allied Forces at the end of the World War II.

Type XVIII 
 Displacement:  1,652 tons submerged
 Armament:  23 x torpedoes
 Performance:  Speed  submerged; Range  at  submerged,  at  surfaced
 Ships in class:  2 (U-796 and U-797)
 Commissioned:  None
 Fate:  Cancelled while building March 1944

Type IXD 
 Displacement:  1,232 tons submerged
 Armament:  6 x 533 mm torpedo tubes with 24 x torpedoes or 48 x mines
 Performance:  Speed  submerged; Range  at  submerged,  at  surfaced; Depth 230 m
 Ships in class:  30 (U-177 to U-182, U-195 to U-200, U-847 to U-852, U-859 to U-864, and U-871 to U-876
 Commissioned:  1942
 Fate:

Type IXC/40 
 Displacement:  1,232 tons submerged
 Armament:  6 x 533 mm torpedo tubes with 22 x torpedoes or 44 x mines
 Performance:  Speed  submerged; Range  at  submerged,  at  surfaced; Depth 230 m
 Ships in class:  87 (U-167 to U-170, U-183 to U-194, U-525 to U-550, U-801 to U-806, U-841 to U-846, U-853 to U-858, U-865 to U-870, U-877 to U-881, U-889, and U-1221 to U-1235)
 Commissioned:  1942
 Fate:

Type IXC 
 Displacement:  1,232 tons submerged
 Armament:  6 x 533 mm torpedo tubes with 22 x torpedoes or 44 x mines
 Performance:  Speed  submerged; Range  at  submerged,  at  surfaced; Depth 230 m
 Ships in class:  54 (U-66 to U-68, U-125 to U-131, U-153 to U-166, U-171 to U-176, and U-501 to U-524)
 Commissioned:  1941
 Fate:

Type IXB 
 Displacement:  1,178 tons submerged
 Armament:  6 x 533 mm torpedo tubes with 22 (32) x torpedoes or 44 x mines
 Performance:  Speed  submerged; Range  at  submerged,  at  surfaced; Depth 230 m
 Ships in class:  14 (U-64, U-65, U-103 to U-111, and U-122 to U-124)
 Commissioned:  1939
 Fate:

Type IX 
 Displacement:  1,152 tons submerged
 Armament:  6 x 533 mm torpedo tubes with 22 (32) x torpedoes or 44 x mines
 Performance:  Speed  submerged; Range  at  submerged,  at  surfaced; Depth 230 m
 Ships in class:  8 (U-37 to U-44)
 Commissioned:  1938
 Fate:  Six sunk in World War II

Type VIIC/42 
 Displacement:  1,099 tons submerged
 Armament:  5 x 533 mm torpedo tubes with 16 x torpedoes or 26 x mines
 Performance:  Speed  submerged; Range  at  submerged,  at  surfaced; Depth 270 m
 Ships in class:  164 ordered
 Commissioned:  None
 Fate:  All contracts cancelled 1943

Type IA 
 Displacement:  983 tons submerged
 Armament:  1 x 10.5 cm deck gun; 6 x 533 mm torpedo tubes with 14 x torpedoes or 28 x mines
 Performance:  Speed  submerged; Range  at  submerged,  at  surfaced; Depth 200 m
 Ships in class:  2
 Commissioned:  1936
 Fate:  Both sunk 1940

Type VIIC/41 
 Displacement:  871 tons submerged
 Armament:  1 x 8.8 cm deck gun; 5 x 533 mm torpedo tubes with 14 x torpedoes or 26 x mines
 Performance:  Speed  submerged; Range  at  submerged,  at  surfaced; Depth 250 m
 Ships in class:  91
 Commissioned:  1943
 Fate:

Type VIIC 
 Displacement:  871 tons submerged
 Armament:  1 x 8.8 cm deck gun; 5 x 533 mm torpedo tubes with 14 x torpedoes or 26 x mines
 Performance:  Speed  submerged; Range  at  submerged,  at  surfaced; Depth 220 m
 Ships in class:  568
 Commissioned:  1941
 Fate:

Type VIIB 
 Displacement:  857 tons submerged
 Armament:  1 x 8.8 cm deck gun; 5 x 533 mm torpedo tubes with 14 x torpedoes or 26 x mines
 Performance:  Speed  submerged; Range  at  submerged,  at  surfaced; Depth 220 m
 Ships in class:  24 (U-45 to U-55, U-73 to U-76, U-83 to U-87, and U-99 to U-102)
 Commissioned:  1938
 Fate:

Type VIIA 
 Displacement:  745 tons submerged
 Armament:  1 x 8.8 cm deck gun; 5 x 533 mm torpedo tubes with 11 x torpedoes or 22 x mines
 Performance:  Speed  submerged; Range  at  submerged,  at  surfaced; Depth 220 m
 Ships in class:  10 (U-27 to U-36)
 Commissioned:  1936
 Fate:  All lost during World War II

Coastal submarines

Type 206A 

 Displacement:  498 tons submerged
 Armament:  8 x 533 mm torpedo tubes with 8 x torpedoes; 24 x mines external
 Performance:  Speed  submerged; Range  at  submerged,  at  surfaced; Depth > 100 m
 Ships in class:  18 (U-13 to U-30)
 Commissioned:  1973-1975
 Fate:  7 remain in active service

Type 205 
 Displacement:  500 tons submerged
 Armament:  8 x 533 mm torpedo tubes
 Performance:  Speed  submerged; Range  at  submerged,  at  surfaced
 Ships in class:  11 (U-1, U-2, U-4 to U-11)
 Commissioned:  1963
 Fate:  Decommissioned 2005

Type 201 
 Displacement:  450 tons submerged
 Armament:  8 x 533 mm torpedo tubes with 8 x torpedoes or 16 x mines
 Performance:  Speed  submerged
 Ships in class:  4 (U-1 to U-4)
 Commissioned:  1962
 Fate:  Decommissioned by 1967 for rebuilding to Type 205A standard

Type IID 
 Displacement:  364 tons submerged
 Armament:  3 x 533 mm torpedo tubes with 5 x torpedoes or 12 x mines
 Performance:  Speed  submerged; Range  at  submerged,  at  surfaced; Depth 150 m
 Ships in class:  16 (U-137 to U-152)
 Commissioned:  1939

Type IIC 
 Displacement:  341 tons submerged
 Armament:  3 x 533 mm torpedo tubes with 5 x torpedoes or 12 x mines
 Performance:  Speed  submerged; Range  at  submerged,  at  surfaced; Depth 150 m
 Ships in class:  8 (U-56 to U-63)
 Commissioned:  1937

Type IIB 
 Displacement:  328 tons submerged
 Armament:  3 x 533 mm torpedo tubes with 5 x torpedoes or 12 x mines
 Performance:  Speed  submerged; Range  at  submerged,  at  surfaced; Depth 150 m
 Ships in class:  20 (U-7 to U-24, U-120, U-121)
 Commissioned:  1935

Type IIA 
 Displacement:  303 tons submerged
 Armament:  3 x 533 mm torpedo tubes with 5 x torpedoes or 12 x mines
 Performance:  Speed  submerged; Range  at  submerged,  at  surfaced; Depth 150 m
 Ships in class:  6 (U-1 to U-6)
 Commissioned:  1935
 Fate:  Three lost in World War II, survivors stricken 1944

Type XXIII 
 Displacement:  258 tons submerged
 Armament:  2 x 533 mm torpedo tubes with 2 x torpedoes
 Performance:  Speed  submerged; Range  at  submerged,  at  surfaced
 Ships in class:  61 (U-2321 to U-2369, U-2371, U-4701 to U-4707, and U-4709 to U-4712)
 Commissioned:  1944
 Fate:  7 lost in World War II

Special purpose submarines

Type UC-90 (or UC-III) long-range mine laying submarine 

 Displacement:  571 tons submerged
 Armament:  3 x 533 mm torpedo tubes; 1 x 3.4 in gun; and 14 x mines
 Performance:  Speed  surfaced;  submerged
 Ships in class:  UC-97 and ???
 Commissioned:  never commissioned

Type UE-II long-range mine laying submarine 
 Displacement:  2,177 tons submerged
 Armament:  ??? and mines
 Performance:  
 Ships in class:  U-117 and ???
 Commissioned:  28 March 1918
 Fate:  U-117 sunk in 1919 as a target in tests by Billy Mitchell.

Type XB mine laying submarine 
 Displacement:  2,177 tons submerged
 Armament:  2 x 533 mm torpedo tubes with 15 x torpedoes and 66 x SMA mines
 Performance:  Speed  submerged; Range  at  submerged,  at  surfaced; Depth 220 m
 Ships in class:  8 (U-116 to U-119, U-219, U-220, U-233, and U-234)
 Commissioned:  1941
 Fate:  Six lost in World War II

Type XIV supply submarine 
 Displacement:  1,932 tons submerged
 Armament:  3 x AA guns
 Performance:  Speed  submerged; Range  at  submerged,  at  surfaced; Depth 240 m
 Ships in class:  10 (U-459 to U-464 and U-487 to U-490)
 Commissioned:  1941
 Fate:

Type VIIF torpedo supply submarine 
 Displacement:  1,181 tons submerged
 Armament:  5 x 533 mm torpedo tubes with 14 x torpedoes
 Performance:  Speed  submerged; Range  at  submerged,  at  surfaced; Depth 200 m
 Ships in class:  4 (U-1059 to U-1062)
 Commissioned:  1943
 Fate:

Type VIID mine laying submarine 
 Displacement:  1,080 tons submerged
 Armament:  5 x 533 mm torpedo tubes with 14 x torpedoes or 26 x mines and 15 x SMA mines
 Performance:  Speed  submerged; Range  at  submerged,  at  surfaced; Depth 200 m
 Ships in class:  6 (U-213 to U-218)
 Commissioned:  1941
 Fate:  Five lost in World War II

Type XVIIB research submarine 
 Displacement:  337 tons submerged
 Armament:  None
 Performance:  Speed  submerged; Range  at  submerged,  at  surfaced
 Ships in class:  12 (U-1405 to U-1416)
 Commissioned:  Three from 1944
 Fate:  Three scuttled May 1945, nine cancelled while building

Hans Techel class (Type 202) 
 Displacement:  137 tons submerged
 Armament:  2 x short torpedo tubes with 2 x torpedoes or 4 x mines
 Performance:  Speed  submerged
 Ships in class:  2:   and 
 Service:  Commissioned from 1965, both decommissioned 1966 and scrapped

Type XVIIA research submarine 
 Displacement:  309 tons submerged
 Armament:  None
 Performance:  Speed  submerged; Range  at  submerged,  at  surfaced
 Ships in class:  4 (U-792 to U-795)
 Commissioned:  1943
 Fate:  All scuttled May 1944

Midget submarines

Type XXVIIB5 Seehund 
 Displacement:  17 tons submerged
 Armament:  2 x torpedoes
 Ships in class:  285
 Commissioned:  1944
 Fate:  35 lost during World War II

Type XXVII Hecht 
 Displacement:  
 Armament:  1 x torpedo or 1 x limpet mine
 Ships in class:  53
 Commissioned:  1944
 Fate:

Molch 
 Displacement:  11 tons
 Armament:  2 x torpedoes
 Performance:  Range  at  submerged
 Ships in class:  393
 Commissioned:  1944
 Fate:

Biber 
 Displacement:  6.5 tons
 Armament:  2 x torpedoes
 Ships in class:  324
 Commissioned:  1944
 Fate:

Surface combatants

Frigates (Fregatten)

(Type 125) 

 Displacement:  7,200 tons
 Armament:  8 x anti-ship/land-attack missiles; 42 x RAM missiles; 1 x 127 mm gun; 2 x MLG 27 autocannon; 5 x 12.7 mm remote machineguns; 2 12.7 mm machineguns, water cannons
 Aircraft:  Landing deck with hangar for two helicopters
 Performance:  Speed ; Range  at 
 Service:  Under development

(Type 124) 

 Displacement:  5,690 tons
 Armament:  1 x VLS with 56 missiles; 42 x RAM missiles; 8 x Harpoon missiles; 1 x 76 mm DP gun; 2 x 27 mm autocannon; 2 x triple torpedo launchers
 Aircraft:  Landing deck with hangar for two Sea Lynx or MH90 helicopters
 Performance:  Speed ; Range  at 
 Service:  Commissioned from 2004, all currently in service

(Type 123) 

 Displacement:  4,900 tons
 Armament:  1 x Mark 41 VLS with 16 missiles; 2 x Mark 49 launcher with 42 missiles; 4 x Exocet missiles; 1 x 76 mm DP gun; 2 x 27 mm autocannon; 4 x 324 mm torpedo tubes
 Aircraft:  Landing deck with hangar for Sea Lynx helicopters
 Performance:  Speed ; Range  at 
 Service:  Commissioned from 1994, all currently in service

(Type 122) 

 Displacement:  3,680 tons
 Armament:  1 x 76 mm guns; rocket launchers; 1 8 cell launch system, 16 Sea Sparrow surface to air missiles; 2 quadruple Harpoon anti-ship missile launchers; 2 MK 49 launcher, 21 RAM each;  2 MLG 27 mm autocannons; 2 Mark 32 324 mm twin torpedo launchers with 8 Mark 46 torpedoes 
 Aircraft: Landing deck with hangar for Sea Lynx helicopters 
 Service:  Commissioned from 1982, all currently in service

(Type 120) 

 Displacement:  2,969 tons
 Armament:  2 x 100 mm guns; 2 x twin 40 mm AA guns; 2 x 40 mm guns; 4 x 533 mm torpedo tubes; 2 x quad 375 mm anti-submarine rocket launchers; depth charges; mines
 Performance:  Speed ; Range  at 
 Service:  Commissioned from 1961, last decommissioned 1989

Corvettes (Korvette)

(Type 130) 

 Displacement:  1,840 tons
 Armament:  1 x 76 mm gun; 2 x 27 mm autocannon; 42 x RAM missiles; 4 x RBS-15 missiles; mines
 Aircraft:  Landing deck with hangar for unmanned aerial vehicles
 Performance:  Speed ; Range  at 
 Service:  Five ships in service, at least five more planned

Flottenbegleiter 
 Displacement:  1,030 tons
 Armament:  2 x 10.5 cm guns; 2 x 8.8 cm guns; 4 x 3.7 cm AA guns; 2 x 2 cm AA guns; 4 x depth charge launchers
 Performance:  Speed ; Range  at 
 Ships in class:  10
 Service:  Commissioned 1936 to 1938, four lost in World War II, many converted to other roles

Torpedo boats (Torpedoboot)

Type 1916 (Mob) 
 Displacement:  1,560 tons
 Armament:  4 x 10.5 cm gun; 4 x machineguns; 6 x 50 cm torpedo tubes; 40 mines
 Performance:  Speed ; Range  at 
 Service:  4 commissioned 1919 to 1921

Type 1924 
 Displacement:  1,320 tons
 Armament:  3 x 10.5 cm guns; 2 x 2 cm AA guns; 6 x 53 cm torpedo tubes; 30 mines
 Performance:  Speed ; Range  at 
 Ships in class:  6
 Service:  Commissioned 1928 to 1929, all lost in World War II

Type 1916 (Mob) 
 Displacement:  1,290 tons
 Armament:  3 x 10.5 cm gun; 6 x 50 cm torpedo tubes; 40 mines
 Performance:  Speed ; Range  at 
 Service:  36 launched, 20 commissioned 1916 to 1918, one lost in World War I, nine scuttled at Scapa Flow

Type 1923 
 Displacement:  1,250 tons
 Armament:  3 x 10.5 cm guns; 2 x 2 cm AA guns; 6 x 53 cm torpedo tubes; 30 mines
 Performance:  Speed ; Range  at 
 Ships in class:  6
 Service:  Commissioned 1926 to 1927, all lost in World War II

Type 1937 
 Displacement:  1,100 tons
 Armament:  1 x 10.5 cm gun; 12 x 2 cm AA guns; 6 x 53 cm torpedo tubes; 30 mines
 Performance:  Speed ; Range  at 
 Ships in class:  9 ( to )
 Service:  Commissioned 1941 to 1942, four lost in World War II, all but one scrapped by 1952

Type 1935 
 Displacement:  1,100 tons
 Armament:  1 x 10.5 cm gun; 12 x 2 cm AA guns; 6 x 53 cm torpedo tubes; 30 mines
 Performance:  Speed ; Range  at 
 Ships in class:  12 ( to )
 Service:  Commissioned 1939 to 1940, seven lost in World War II, all but one scrapped by 1952

Type 1913 
 Displacement:  1,100 tons
 Armament:  3 x 8.8 cm gun; 6 x 50 cm torpedo tubes; 24 mines
 Performance:  Speed ; Range  at 
 Service:  Commissioned 1914 to 1917

Type 1906 
 Displacement:  800 tons
 Armament:  3 x 10.5 cm guns; 3 x 8.8 cm gun; 3 x 45 cm torpedo tubes
 Performance:  Speed ; Range  at 
 Service:  Commissioned 1907 to 1911

Type 1911 
 Displacement:  750 tons
 Armament:  2 x 8.8 cm gun; 4 x 45 cm torpedo tubes
 Performance:  Speed ; Range  at 
 Service:  Commissioned 1912 to 1913

Type 1898 
 Displacement:  600 tons
 Armament:  1 x 8.8 cm gun; 4 x 5.2 cm guns; 2 x 5 cm guns; 3 x 45 cm torpedo tubes
 Performance:  Speed ; Range  at 
 Service:  Commissioned 1899 to 1907, 12 lost in World War I, last scrapped in 1921

Type 1916 
 Displacement:  390 tons
 Armament:  3 x 8.8 cm gun; 1 x 45 cm torpedo tube; depth charges
 Performance:  Speed ; Range  at 
 Ships in class:  68 ( to )
 Service:  40 launched, 36 commissioned 1917 to 1918, 9 lost in World War II, most scrapped by 1923

Type 1915 
 Displacement:  250 tons
 Armament:  3 x 8.8 cm gun; 1 x 45 cm torpedo tube; depth charges
 Performance:  Speed ; Range  at 
 Ships in class:  30 ( to )
 Service:  Commissioned 1916 to 1917

Type 1897 
 Displacement:  175 tons
 Armament:  3 x 5 cm gun; 3 x 45 cm torpedo tubes
 Performance:  Speed ; Range  at 
 Ships in class:  8 ( to )
 Service:  Commissioned 1897 to 1898, all scrapped in 1921

Type 1892 
 Displacement:  175 tons
 Armament:  1 x 5 cm gun; 3 x 45 cm torpedo tubes
 Performance:  Speed ; Range  at 
 Ships in class:  16 ( to )
 Service:  Commissioned 1892 to 1896, four lost in World War I, last scrapped in 1921

Type 1885 
 Displacement:  150 tons
 Armament:  1 x 5 cm gun; 2 x 3.7 cm revolver cannon; 3 x 45 cm torpedo tubes
 Performance:  Speed ; Range  at 
 Ships in class:  59 ( to )
 Service:  Commissioned 1885 to 1892, 15 lost in World War I, last scrapped 1921

Type 1914 
 Displacement:  148 tons
 Armament:  1 x 5 cm gun; 2 x 45 cm torpedo tubes; 4 mines
 Performance:  Speed ; Range  at 
 Ships in class:  25 ( to )
 Service:  Commissioned 1915

Fast attack craft (Schnellboot)

(Type 143) 

 Displacement:  398 tons
 Armament:  2 x 76 mm guns; 4 x Exocet missiles; 2 x torpedo tubes
 Performance:  Speed 
 Ships in class:  10 (S61 to S70)
 Service:  Commissioned from 1976, last decommissioned 2005

(Type 143A) 

 Displacement:  391 tons
 Armament:  1 x 76 mm gun; 4 x Exocet missiles; 21 RAM missiles; 2 x MG50 machine guns; mines
 Performance:  Speed 
 Ships in class:  10 (S71 to S80)
 Service:  Commissioned from 1982, currently in service

(Type 148) 
 Displacement:  265 tons
 Armament:  1 x 76 mm gun; 4 x Exocet missiles; 1 x 40 mm gun; 8 x mines
 Performance:  Speed 
 Ships in class:  20 (S41 to S60)
 Service:  Commissioned from 1972, last decommissioned 2002

(Type 142) 
 Displacement:  205 tons
 Armament:  2 x 40 mm guns; 4 x 533 mm torpedo tubes
 Performance:  Speed 
 Ships in class:  10 (S31 to S40)
 Service:  Commissioned from 1961, last decommissioned 1984

(Type 141) 
 Displacement:  190 tons
 Armament:  2 x 40 mm guns; 4 x 533 mm torpedo tubes; 4 x depth charges
 Performance:  Speed 
 Ships in class:  10 (S6 to S11 and S25 to S28)
 Service:  Commissioned from 1958, last decommissioned 1976

(Type 140) 
 Displacement:  183 tons
 Armament:  2 x 40 mm guns; 4 x 533 mm torpedo tubes; 4 x depth charges (optionally may ship 2 x minelaying ramps instead of two tubes)
 Performance:  Speed ; Range 
 Ships in class:  20 (S1 to S5, S12 to S24, S29, and S30)
 Service:  Commissioned from 1957, last decommissioned 1975

Type 1939/40 
 Displacement:  110 tons
 Armament:  6 x 3 cm AA gun; 2 x 2 cm AA gun; 2 x 53 cm torpedo tubes; 8 mines
 Performance:  Speed 
 Ships in class:  220 (S26 to S29, S38 to S53, S62 to S150; S159 to S232; S301 to S328; S701 to  S709)
 Service:  Commissioned 1941 to 1945, many scrapped before completion

Type 1939 
 Displacement:  102 tons
 Armament:  1 x 2 cm gun; 8 x machineguns; 2 x 53 cm torpedo tubes; 6 mines
 Performance:  Speed ; Range  at 
 Ships in class:  16 (S30 to S37, S54 to S61)
 Service:  Commissioned 1939 to 1941, twelve lost in World War II

Type 1937 
 Displacement:  105 tons
 Armament:  1 x 2 cm gun; 1 x machinegun; 2 x 53 cm torpedo tubes
 Performance:  Speed ; Range  at 
 Ships in class:  8 (S18 to S25)
 Service:  Commissioned 1938 to 1939, one lost in World War II

Type 1934 
 Displacement:  105 tons
 Armament:  1 x 2 cm gun; 1 x machinegun; 2 x 53 cm torpedo tubes
 Performance:  Speed ; Range  at 
 Ships in class:  4 (S14 to S17)
 Service:  Commissioned 1936 to 1938, two lost in World War II, others turned over to Allies

Type 1933 
 Displacement:  90 tons
 Armament:  1 x 2 cm gun; 4 x machineguns; 2 x 53 cm torpedo tubes
 Performance:  Speed ; Range  at 
 Ships in class:  7 (S7 to S13)
 Service:  Commissioned 1934 to 1935, one scuttled in World War II, remainder turned over to Allies

Nasty class (Type 152) 

 Displacement:  398 tons
 Armament:  2 x 76 mm guns; 4 x Exocet missiles; 2 x torpedo tubes
 Performance:  Speed 
 Ships in class:  2:   and 
 Service:  Commissioned from 1960, both decommissioned 1964

Type 1931 
 Displacement:  57 tons
 Armament:  1 x 2 cm gun; 2 x 53 cm torpedo tubes
 Performance:  Speed ; Range  at 
 Ships in class:  4 (S2 to S5)
 Service:  Commissioned 1932, all to Spain in 1936

Leichte Schnellboote 
 Displacement:  12 tons
 Armament:  2 x 2 cm guns; 1 x machinegun; 2 x 45 cm torpedo tubes; 4 mines
 Performance:  Speed ; Range  at 
 Ships in class:  12
 Service:  Commissioned 1940 to 1944, all but one lost during World War II

Mine warfare vessels

Minehunters (Minensuchboot)

Sperrbrecher 
 Displacement:  7,500 tons (typical)
 Armament:  2 x 10.5 cm guns; 2 x 3.7 cm AA gun; 15 x 2 cm AA guns (typical)
 Performance:  Speed 14 knots (typical)
 Ships in class:  Around 100
 Service:  Converted from merchant ships through World War II, about 50 lost, many returned to merchant duties after the war

Type 1935 
 Displacement:  870 tons
 Armament:  2 x 10.5 cm guns; 1 x 3.7 cm AA gun; 6 x 2 cm AA guns; 4 x depth charge launchers; 30 mines
 Performance:  Speed ; Range  at 
 Ships in class:  69
 Service:  Commissioned 1938 to 1943, 34 lost during World War II, five served with German Federal Navy

Type 1943 
 Displacement:  821 tons
 Armament:  2 x 10.5 cm guns; 2 x 3.7 cm AA gun; 8 x 2 cm AA guns; 4 x depth charge launchers; 24 mines
 Performance:  Speed ; Range  at 
 Ships in class:  17
 Service:  Commissioned 1944 to 1945, one lost during World War II

Type 1941 
 Displacement:  775 tons
 Armament:  2 x 10.5 cm guns; 4 x 3.7 cm AA gun; 10 x 2 cm AA guns; 4 x depth charge launchers
 Performance:  Speed ; Range  at 
 Ships in class:  131
 Service:  Commissioned 1941 to 1944, 63 lost during World War II, five served with German Federal Navy

(Type 352) 

 Displacement: 650 tons
 Armament: 
Bofors 40 mm/L70 dual-purpose gun (to be upgraded to 2 Mauser MLG27 27 mm remote-controlled guns)
Fliegerfaust 2 surface-to-air missiles (MANPADS)
Mine-laying capabilities (60 mines)
 Performance:  Speed 
 Service:  Commissioned from 1990, all in active service

(Type 332) 

 Displacement:  660 tons
 Armament:  1 x 40 mm DP gun; mines (currently upgrading to 1 x MLG 27 mm autocannon)
 Performance:  Speed 
 Service:  Commissioned from 1992, all in active service

(Type 333) 

 Displacement:  645 tons
 Armament:  2 x 40 mm DP guns (currently upgrading to 1 x MLG 27 mm autocannon); 2 x anti-aircraft missile launchers; mines 
 Performance:  Speed 
 Service:  Commissioned from 1989, all in active service

Seehund ROV (part of the TROIKA Plus system of the Ensdorf-class minesweepers) 

 Length: 25 m
 Displacement: 97.8t
 Propulsion: Schottel Z-drive
 Max speed: 9-10kts
 Ships in class: 18: all in active service
Seehund can be controlled remotely or manually by an onboard crew (usually 3) for maneuvering in harbours or in training (the Seehund is too large to be carried by Ensdorf-class vessels). A life raft is carried for this reason.

Type 1916 
 Displacement:  630 tons
 Armament:  2 x 8.8 cm guns; 30 x mines
 Performance:  Speed ; Range  at 
 Ships in class:  120 (M57 to M176)
 Service:  91 launched, 81 commissioned 1918 to 1920, 8 lost in World War I

Type 1915 
 Displacement:  510 tons
 Armament:  2 x 10.5 cm guns; 30 x mines (some boats shipped 3 x 8.8 cm guns instead of 2 x 10.5 cm guns)
 Performance:  Speed ; Range  at 
 Ships in class:  30 (M27 to M56)
 Service:  Commissioned 1916, 10 lost in World War I

Type 1914 
 Displacement:  475 tons
 Armament:  2 x 8.8 cm guns; 1 x 3.7 cm revolver cannon; 30 x mines
 Performance:  Speed ; Range  at 
 Ships in class:  26 (M1 to M26)
 Service:  Commissioned 1914 to 1917, 11 lost in World War I

Flachgehende Minensuchboote 
 Displacement:  205 tons
 Armament:  1 x 8.8 cm gun
 Performance:  Speed ; Range  at 
 Ships in class:  66 (FM1 to FM66)
 Service:  54 launched, commissioned 1918 to 1919, 6 lost in World War II

Minenräumboot 
 Displacement:  155 tons
 Armament:  1 x 3.7 cm AA gun; 3 x 2 cm AA guns; 1 x 8.6 cm Föhn launcher
 Performance:  Speed 
 Ships in class:  300
 Service:  About 160 lost during World War II

Mine layers (Minenleger)

Displacement:  2,500 tons
 Armament:  8 x 8.8 cm guns; 288 x mines
 Performance:  Speed ; Range  at 
 Ships in class:  1
 Service:  Commissioned 1908, scrapped 1921

Auxiliary mine layer (Hilfsminenleger) 
 Displacement:  300 to 4,200 tons
 Ships in class:  16 conversions
 Service:  Converted from various merchant and passenger ships, commissioned as mine layers in 1914, all survived World War I, most returned to civil duties

Küstenminenleger 
 Displacement:  19 tons
 Armament:  2 x 2 cm guns; 4 mines
 Performance:  Speed ; Range  at 
 Ships in class:  36 (KM1 to KM36)
 Service:  Commissioned 1941 to 1943

Amphibious warfare vessels

Landing craft (Landungsboote)

(Type 520) 

 Displacement:  430 tons
 Armament:  2 x 20 mm autocannon; mines
 Capacity:  150 t
 Performance:  Speed 
 Ships in class:  22
 Service:  Commissioned from 1965, two remain in active service

Type 554 

 Displacement:  375 tons
 Armament:  2 x 12.7 mm machineguns
 Capacity:  125 t or 400 troops
 Performance:  Speed ; Range  at 
 Ships in class:  1
 Service:  1958 to 1964

Type 521 

 Displacement:  111 tons
 Armament:  Small arms
 Capacity:  53 t
 Performance:  Speed 
 Ships in class:  28
 Service:  Commissioned from 1965, decommissioned

Type 552 
 Displacement:  13 tons
 Capacity:  0.4 t or 36 troops
 Performance:  Speed ; Range 
 Ships in class:  9
 Service:  1958 to 1964

Auxiliary ships

Tenders and replenishment ships

(Type 702) 

 Displacement:  20,240 tons
 Armament:  4 x 27 mm autocannon; Fliegerfaust 2 missiles
 Aircraft:  Helicopter deck with hangar for two large helicopters
 Ships in class:  2:   and 
 Service:  Commissioned from 2001, both in active service, 2 more planned ( and 1 other)

(Type 704A) 
 Displacement:  14,170 tons
 Capacity:  44,760 m
 Performance:  Speed 
 Ships in class:  2:   and 
 Service:  Commissioned from 1966, two remain in active service

(Type 404) 

 Displacement:  3,586 tons
 Armament:  2 x Fliegerfaust missiles; 2 x 20 mm autocannon
 Aircraft:  Helicopter deck, no hangar
 Capacity:  700 m fuel; 60 m aviation fuel; 280 m fresh water; 160t ammunition; 40t supplies
 Performance:  Speed ; Range 
 Service:  Commissioned from 1993, all in active service

(Type 703) 
 Displacement:  2,190 tons
 Capacity:  1,100t fuel; 60t fresh water
 Performance:  Speed 
 Service:  Commissioned from 1966, two remain in active service

Surveillance, reconnaissance, and ELINT ships

(Type 423) 
 Displacement:  3,200 tons
 Performance:  Speed ; Range 
 Service:  Commissioned from 1988, all in active service

Research ships

(Type 753) 
 Displacement: 2,744 tons
 Performance: 
 Ships in class 1: 
 Service: In active service
Note: Alliance is a ship of the NATO under German flag and command.

(Type 751) 

 Displacement:  3,500 tons
 Performance: Speed 
 Ships in class: 1: 
 Service:  Commissioned in 2005, in active service

(Type 748) 

(Type 741) 
 Service: 1 in active service

Tugs

(Type 722) 

 Displacement:  798 tons
 Performance:  Speed 
 Service:  Commissioned from 1968, two remain in active service

(Type 720) 
 Ships in class:  2:   and 
 Service:  Commissioned from 1966, Fehmarn remains in active service

Icebreakers

(Type 721) 
 Displacement:  560 tons
 Performance:  Speed 
 Ships in class:  2:   and 
 Service:  Commissioned from 1961, both decommissioned, one sold, one scrapped

Training ships (Schulschiffe)

(Type 440) 
 Displacement:  3,200 tons
 Armament:  4 x 100 mm guns; 2 x twin 40 mm guns, 2 x 40 mm guns; 2 x 533 mm torpedo tubes; 2 x quad 375 mm anti submarine rocket launchers, 2 x depth charge rails; mines
 Performance:  Speed 
 Ships in class:  1
 Service:  Commissioned 1966, decommissioned 1990

(Type 441) 
 Displacement:  1,760 tons
 Performance:  Speed 
 Ships in class:  1
 Service:  Commissioned 1958, in active service

Transport ships

(Type 760) 

 Displacement:  4,042 tons
 Performance:  Speed 
 Ships in class:  2:   and 
 Service:  Commissioned from 1967, Westerwald remains in active service

Oil recovery ships

(Type 738)

 Displacement: 650 tons
 Performance: Speed 
 Ships in class:  2:   and 
 Service: 2 in active service

References

Military ship classes by country
Naval ship classes